Richard Doheny (born March 29, 1959) is an American professional stock car racing driver and crew chief who competes part-time in the ARCA Menards Series and ARCA Menards Series East for Fast Track Racing. He also serves as a crew chief for the team when he is not driving.

Racing career

Doheny made his ARCA Racing Series start in 2013 in Pocono with Fast Track Racing, where he would finish 33rd after running only 6 laps due an axle issue. He would return with the team the following year at the season opener at Daytona, finishing 30th due to a battery problem.

Doheny would remain with Fast Track from 2015 through 2018 primarily driving various start and park entries.

For the 2019 season, Doheny would continue with Fast Track, and would run 16 of the 20 races on the schedule finishing 9th in the standings with a best finish of 12th at Springfield, which was the only race he finished. It was during this year that Doheny would serve as the crew chief for multiple drivers alongside his driving duties. He would run three races in 2020 with a best finish of 13th at Kentucky, and would continue serving as a crew chief.

In 2021, Doheny would run three races, and achieved his first top-10 with a 10th place finish at Toledo. He would once again serve as a crew chief for Fast Track, primarily for D. L. Wilson. Doheny would also run the first four races of the ARCA Menards Series East season.

Personal life
Outside of racing, Doheny owns and operates a small building mechanical business that focuses on HVAC design and building automation.

Motorsports career results

ARCA Menards Series
(key) (Bold – Pole position awarded by qualifying time. Italics – Pole position earned by points standings or practice time. * – Most laps led.)

ARCA Menards Series East

References

Living people
1959 births
ARCA Menards Series drivers
NASCAR drivers
People from Ballston Spa, New York
Racing drivers from New York (state)